Captain Rashid Sazmand Asfaranjan (born 24 October 1951) is an Iranian business executive. He was the CEO and a board member of Malavan F.C. from 1996 to 2006. Currently, he is a senior consultant to the board of directors and a board member of Akam Ata Anzali Free Zone Co., which is an international marketing and trade, and management consulting company based in Iran.

Career

Malavan F.C. 
He is a former CEO and board member of Malavan F.C.

AKAM ATA 
On 13 July 2019, he was assigned as a senior consultant to the board of directors of Akam Ata Anzali Free Zone Company called AKAM ATA. Akam Ata is an international marketing and trade, export and import, business management consulting service provider with a team of business consultants in Iran. Yasha Sazmand, MBA is the Founder, CEO and a board member of Akam Ata.

Honours 
 Hazfi Cup: 1987, 1990–91; runner-up: 1987–88, 1988–89, 1991–92
 Azadegan League: runner-up: 2003

References

External links
  اخبار ملوان بندر انزلی » 1.3- مدیران ومربیان
  http://www.malavan.ir/aaa/news.php?item.594.1 
  http://www.ilenc.ir/Design/Print/RegisterOrgPrint.aspx?param=14008463342&extra=JSH1HG
  روزنامه رسمی جمهوری اسلامی ایران

Iranian footballers
Iranian football managers
Iranian football chairmen and investors
Iranian businesspeople
People from Bandar-e Anzali
Living people
1951 births
Iranian sports executives and administrators
Association footballers not categorized by position